Pipra is an Administrative Block & Nagar Panchayat in Supaul district in the Indian state of Bihar.

About Pipra 
Pipra is a Block in Supaul District of Bihar State, India. Pipra Block headquarters is Pipra town. It belongs to Kosi Division.

Pipra consists of 39 villages and 16 Panchayats. Lachhumandas Chak is the smallest village and Pathrajolhania is the biggest village. It is in the 57 m elevation (altitude).

Demographics of Pipra 
Maithili is the local language here. Also people speak Hindi, Urdu, Angika. Total population of Pipra Block is 157,779 living in 28,992 houses, spread across total 39 villages and 16 panchayats. Males are 81,912 and Females are 75,867.

Overview
As per Delimitation of Parliamentary and Assembly constituencies Order, 2008, No. 42  Pipra Assembly constituency is composed of the following: Pipra and Kishanpur community development blocks; Veena, Laudh, Karhio, Amha, Hardi East and Hardi West gram panchayats of Supaul CD Block.

Pipra Assembly constituency is part of No. 8 Supaul (Lok Sabha constituency).

Members of the Legislative Assembly

Election results

2020

References

External links
 

Assembly constituencies of Bihar
Politics of Supaul district